Osama bin Mohammed bin Awad bin Laden (10 March 1957 – 2 May 2011) was a Saudi Arabian-born militant and founder of the Pan-Islamic militant organization . The group is designated as a terrorist group by the United Nations Security Council, the North Atlantic Treaty Organization (NATO), the European Union, and various countries. Under bin Laden, al-Qaeda was responsible for the September 11 attacks in the United States and many other mass-casualty attacks worldwide. 

A member of the wealthy Bin Laden family, Osama bin Laden was born in Saudi Arabia. His father was Mohammed bin Awad bin Laden, a Saudi millionaire from Hadhramaut, Yemen, and the founder of the construction company, Saudi Binladin Group. His mother, Alia Ghanem, was from a secular middle-class family in Latakia, Syria. He studied at university in the country until 1979, when he joined Mujahideen forces in Pakistan fighting against the Soviet Union in Afghanistan. He helped to fund the Mujahideen by funneling arms, money, and fighters from the Arab world into Afghanistan, and gained popularity among many Arabs. In 1988, he formed al-Qaeda. He was banished from Saudi Arabia in 1992, lost his Saudi citizenship in 1994, and shifted his base to Sudan until US pressure forced him to leave in 1996. After establishing a new base in Afghanistan, he declared a war against the United States, launching a series of bombings and related attacks. His involvement in the 1998 US embassy bombings landed him on the American Federal Bureau of Investigation's (FBI) lists of Ten Most Wanted Fugitives and Most Wanted Terrorists.

Bin Laden masterminded the September 11 attacks, which killed nearly 3,000 people and led President George W. Bush to invade Afghanistan and launch the "War on Terror". He became the subject of a decade-long international manhunt, during which the FBI offered a $25million bounty on him. On 2 May 2011, he was killed by U.S. special operations forces at his compound in Abbottabad, Pakistan.

A highly influential ideologue, Bin Laden was able to first acquire sympathizers in the Islamic World due to his status a war-hero of the Afghan Jihad and subsequent focus on attacking Western imperialism. His targeting of civilians and hostile activities against Western governments have made him a reviled figure in the Western World and Western culture, and his role in the September 11 attacks has made public opinion of him in the United States unequivocally negative.

Name 

There is no universally accepted standard for transliterating Arabic words and Arabic names into English; however, bin Laden's name is most frequently rendered as "Osama bin Laden". The FBI and Central Intelligence Agency (CIA), as well as other US governmental agencies, have used either "Usama bin Laden" or "Usama bin Ladin". Less common renderings include "Ussamah bin Ladin" and, in the French-language media, "Oussama ben Laden". Other spellings include "Binladen" or, as used by his family in the West, "Binladin". The spellings with o and e come from a Persian-influenced pronunciation also used in Afghanistan, where bin Laden spent many years.

Osama bin Laden's full name, Osama bin Mohammed bin Awad bin Laden, means "Osama, son of Mohammed, son of Awad, son of Laden". "Mohammed" refers to bin Laden's father Mohammed bin Laden; "Awad" refers to his grandfather, Awad bin Aboud bin Laden, a Kindite Hadhrami tribesman; "Laden" refers not to bin Laden's great-grandfather, who was named Aboud, but to Aboud's father, Laden Ali al-Qahtani.

The Arabic linguistic convention would be to refer to him as "Osama" or "Osama bin Laden", not "bin Laden" alone, as "bin Laden" is a patronymic, not a surname in the Western manner. According to bin Laden's son Omar bin Laden, the family's hereditary surname is "al-Qahtani", but bin Laden's father, Mohammed bin Laden, never officially registered the name.

Osama bin Laden had also assumed the  "Abū 'Abdāllāh" ("father of Abdallah"). His admirers have referred to him by several nicknames, including the "Prince" or "Emir", the "Sheik", the "Jihadist Sheik" or "Sheik al-Mujahid", "Hajj", and the "Director". The word  means "lion", earning him the nicknames "Lion" and "Lion Sheik".

Early life and education 

Bin Laden was born in Riyadh, Saudi Arabia, a son of Yemeni Mohammed bin Awad bin Laden, a billionaire construction magnate with close ties to the Saudi royal family, and Mohammed bin Laden's tenth wife, Syrian Hamida al-Attas (then called Alia Ghanem). In a 1998 interview, bin Laden gave his birth date as 10 March 1957. Despite it being generally accepted that bin Laden was born in Riyadh, his birthplace was listed as Jeddah in the initial FBI and Interpol documents.

Mohammed bin Laden divorced Hamida soon after Osama bin Laden was born. Mohammed recommended Hamida to Mohammed al-Attas, an associate. Al-Attas married Hamida in the late 1950s or early 1960s. The couple had four children, and bin Laden lived in the new household with three half-brothers and one half-sister. The bin Laden family made $5 billion in the construction industry, of which Osama later inherited around $25–30 million.

Bin Laden was raised as a devout Sunni Muslim. From 1968 to 1976, he attended the elite Al-Thager Model School. He studied economics and business administration at King Abdulaziz University. Some reports suggest he earned a degree in civil engineering in 1979, or a degree in public administration in 1981. Bin Laden attended an English-language course in Oxford, England, during 1971. One source described him as "hard working"; another said he left university during his third year without completing a college degree. At university, bin Laden's main interest was religion, where he was involved in both "interpreting the Quran and jihad" and charitable work. Other interests included writing poetry; reading, with the works of Field Marshal Bernard Montgomery and Charles de Gaulle said to be among his favorites; black stallions; and association football, in which he enjoyed playing at centre forward and followed the English club Arsenal.

Personal life 

At age 17 in 1974, bin Laden married Najwa Ghanem at Latakia, Syria; but they were later separated and she left Afghanistan on 9 September 2001. Bin Laden's other known wives were Khadijah Sharif (married 1983, divorced 1990s); Khairiah Sabar (married 1985); Siham Sabar (married 1987); and Amal al-Sadah (married 2000). Some sources also list a sixth wife, name unknown, whose marriage to bin Laden was annulled soon after the ceremony. Bin Laden fathered between 20 and 26 children with his wives.

Nasser al-Bahri, who was bin Laden's personal bodyguard from 1997 to 2001, details bin Laden's personal life in his memoir. He describes him as a frugal man and strict father, who enjoyed taking his large family on shooting trips and picnics in the desert.

Bin Laden's father Mohammed died in 1967 in an airplane crash in Saudi Arabia when his American pilot Jim Harrington misjudged a landing. Bin Laden's eldest half-brother, Salem bin Laden, the subsequent head of the bin Laden family, was killed in 1988 near San Antonio, Texas, in the United States, when he accidentally flew a plane into power lines.

Bin Laden had an olive complexion and was left-handed, usually walking with a cane. He wore a plain white keffiyeh. Bin Laden had stopped wearing the traditional Saudi male keffiyeh and instead wore the traditional Yemeni male keffiyeh. Bin Laden was described as soft-spoken and mild-mannered in demeanor.

Beliefs and ideology 

A major component of bin Laden's ideology was the concept that civilians from enemy countries, including women and children, were legitimate targets for jihadists to kill. According to former CIA analyst Michael Scheuer, who led the CIA's hunt for Osama bin Laden, the al-Qaeda leader was motivated by a belief that US foreign policy has oppressed, killed, or otherwise harmed Muslims in the Middle East. As such, the threat to US national security arises not from al-Qaeda being offended by what the US is but rather by what the US does, or in the words of Scheuer, "They (al-Qaeda) hate us (Americans) for what we do, not who we are." Nonetheless, bin Laden criticized the US for its secular form of governance, calling upon Americans to convert to Islam and reject the immoral acts of fornication, homosexuality, intoxicants, gambling, and usury, in a letter published in late 2002.

Bin Laden believed that the Islamic world was in crisis and that the complete restoration of Sharia law would be the only way to set things right in the Muslim world. He opposed such alternatives as secular government, as well as pan-Arabism, socialism, communism, and democracy. He subscribed to the Athari (literalist) school of Islamic theology.

These beliefs, in conjunction with violent jihad, have sometimes been called Qutbism after being promoted by Sayyid Qutb. Bin Laden believed that Afghanistan, under the rule of Mullah Omar's Taliban, was "the only Islamic country" in the Muslim world. Bin Laden consistently dwelt on the need for violent jihad to right what he believed were injustices against Muslims perpetrated by the United States and sometimes by other non-Muslim states. He also called for the elimination of Israel, and called upon the United States to withdraw all of its civilians and military personnel from the Middle East, as well as from every Islamic country of the world.

His viewpoints and methods of achieving them had led to him being designated as a terrorist by scholars, journalists from The New York Times, the BBC, and Qatari news station Al Jazeera, analysts such as Peter Bergen, Michael Scheuer, Marc Sageman, and Bruce Hoffman. He was indicted on terrorism charges by law enforcement agencies in Madrid, New York City, and Tripoli.

In 1997, he condemned the United States for its hypocrisy in not labeling the bombing of Hiroshima as terrorism. In November 2001, he maintained that the revenge killing of Americans was justified because he claimed that Islamic law allows believers to attack invaders even when the enemy uses human shields. However, according to Rodenbeck, "this classical position was originally intended as a legal justification for the accidental killings of civilians under very limited circumstances — not as a basis for the intentional targeting of noncombatants." A few months later in a 2002 letter, he made no mention of this justification but claimed "that since the United States is a democracy, all citizens bear responsibility for its government's actions, and civilians are therefore fair targets."

Bin Laden's overall strategy for achieving his goals against much larger enemies such as the Soviet Union and United States was to lure them into a long war of attrition in Muslim countries, attracting large numbers of jihadists who would never surrender. He believed this would lead to economic collapse of the enemy countries, by "bleeding" them dry. Al-Qaeda manuals express this strategy. In a 2004 tape broadcast by Al Jazeera, bin Laden spoke of "bleeding America to the point of bankruptcy".

A number of errors and inconsistencies in bin Laden's arguments have been alleged by authors such as Max Rodenbeck and Noah Feldman. He invoked democracy both as an example of the deceit and fraudulence of Western political system—American law being "the law of the rich and wealthy"—and as the reason civilians are responsible for their government's actions and so can be lawfully punished by death. He denounced democracy as a "religion of ignorance" that violates Islam by issuing man-made laws, but in a later statement compares the Western democracy of Spain favorably to the Muslim world in which the ruler is accountable. Rodenbeck states, "Evidently, [bin Laden] has never heard theological justifications for democracy, based on the notion that the will of the people must necessarily reflect the will of an all-knowing God."

Bin Laden was heavily anti-Semitic, stating that most of the negative events that occurred in the world were the direct result of Jewish actions. In a December 1998 interview with Pakistani journalist Rahimullah Yusufzai, bin Laden stated that Operation Desert Fox was proof that Israeli Jews controlled the governments of the United States and the United Kingdom, directing them to kill as many Muslims as they could. In a letter released in late 2002, he stated that Jews controlled the civilian media outlets, politics, and economic institutions of the United States. In a May 1998 interview with ABC's John Miller, bin Laden stated that the Israeli state's ultimate goal was to annex the Arabian Peninsula and the Middle East into its territory and enslave its peoples, as part of what he called a "Greater Israel". He stated that Jews and Muslims could never get along and that war was "inevitable" between them, and further accused the US of stirring up anti-Islamic sentiment. He claimed that the US State Department and US Department of Defense were controlled by Jews, for the sole purpose of serving the Israeli state's goals. He often delivered warnings against alleged Jewish conspiracies: "These Jews are masters of usury and leaders in treachery. They will leave you nothing, either in this world or the next." Shia Muslims have been listed along with heretics, the United States, and Israel as the four principal enemies of Islam at ideology classes of bin Laden's al-Qaeda organization.

Bin Laden was opposed to music on religious grounds, and his attitude towards technology was mixed. He was interested in earth-moving machinery and genetic engineering of plants on the one hand, but rejected chilled water on the other.

Bin Laden also believed climate change to be a serious threat and penned a letter urging Americans to work with President Barack Obama to make a rational decision to "save humanity from the harmful gases that threaten its destiny".

Militant and political career

Mujahideen in Afghanistan 
After leaving college in 1979, bin Laden went to Pakistan, joined Abdullah Azzam and used money and machinery from his own construction company to help the Mujahideen resistance in the Soviet–Afghan War. He later told a journalist: "I felt outraged that an injustice had been committed against the people of Afghanistan." From 1979 to 1992, the United States (as part of CIA activities in Afghanistan, specifically Operation Cyclone), Saudi Arabia, and China provided between $6–12 billion worth of financial aid and weapons to tens of thousands of mujahideen through Pakistan's Inter-Services Intelligence (ISI). British journalist Jason Burke wrote: "He did not receive any direct funding or training from the US during the 1980s. Nor did his followers. The Afghan mujahideen, via Pakistan's ISI intelligence agency, received large amounts of both. Some bled to the Arabs fighting the Soviets but nothing significant." Bin Laden met and built relations with Hamid Gul, who was a three-star general in the Pakistani army and head of the ISI agency. Although the United States provided the money and weapons, the training of militant groups was entirely done by the Pakistani Armed Forces and the ISI. According to some CIA officers, beginning in early 1980, bin Laden acted as a liaison between the Saudi General Intelligence Presidency (GIP) and Afghan warlords; no evidence of contact between the CIA and Bin Laden exists in the CIA archives. Steve Coll states that although bin Laden may not have been a formal, salaried GIP agent, "it seems clear that bin Laden did have a substantial relationship with Saudi intelligence." Bin Laden's first trainer was U.S. Special Forces commando Ali Mohamed.

By 1984, bin Laden and Azzam established Maktab al-Khidamat, which funneled money, arms, and fighters from around the Arab world into Afghanistan. Through al-Khadamat, bin Laden's inherited family fortune paid for air tickets and accommodation, paid for paperwork with Pakistani authorities and provided other such services for the jihadi fighters. Bin Laden established camps inside Khyber Pakhtunkhwa in Pakistan and trained volunteers from across the Muslim world to fight against the Soviet-backed regime, the Democratic Republic of Afghanistan. Between 1986 and 1987, bin Laden set up a base in eastern Afghanistan for several dozen of his own Arab soldiers. From this base, bin Laden participated in some combat activity against the Soviets, such as the Battle of Jaji in 1987. Despite its little strategic significance, the battle was lionized in the mainstream Arab press. It was during this time that he became idolised by many Arabs.

1988 Gilgit massacre 

In May 1988, responding to rumours of a massacre of Sunnis by Shias, large numbers of Shias from in and around Gilgit, Pakistan were killed in a massacre. Shia civilians were also subjected to rape.

The massacre is alleged by B. Raman, a founder of India's Research and Analysis Wing, to have been in response to a revolt by the Shias of Gilgit during the rule of military dictator Zia-ul Haq. He alleged that the Pakistan Army induced Osama bin Laden to lead an armed group of Sunni tribals, from Afghanistan and the North-West Frontier Province, into Gilgit and its surrounding areas to suppress the revolt.

Formation and structuring of al-Qaeda 

By 1988, bin Laden had split from Maktab al-Khidamat. While Azzam acted as support for Afghan fighters, bin Laden wanted a more military role. One of the main points leading to the split and the creation of al-Qaeda was Azzam's insistence that Arab fighters be integrated among the Afghan fighting groups instead of forming a separate fighting force. Notes of a meeting of bin Laden and others on 20 August 1988, indicate that al-Qaeda was a formal group by that time: "Basically an organized Islamic faction, its goal is to lift the word of God, to make his religion victorious." A list of requirements for membership itemized the following: listening ability, good manners, obedience, and making a pledge (bayat) to follow one's superiors.

According to Wright, the group's real name was not used in public pronouncements because its existence was still a closely held secret. His research suggests that al-Qaeda was formed at an 11 August 1988, meeting between several senior leaders of Egyptian Islamic Jihad, Abdullah Azzam, and bin Laden, where it was agreed to join bin Laden's money with the expertise of the Islamic Jihad organization and take up the jihadist cause elsewhere after the Soviets withdrew from Afghanistan.

Following the Soviet Union's withdrawal from Afghanistan in February 1989, Osama bin Laden returned to Saudi Arabia as a hero of jihad. Along with his Arab legion, he was thought to have brought down the mighty superpower of the Soviet Union. After his return to Saudi Arabia, bin Laden engaged in opposition movements to the Saudi monarchy while working for his family business. He offered to send al-Qaeda to overthrow the Soviet-aligned Yemeni Socialist Party government in South Yemen but was rebuffed by Prince Turki bin Faisal. He then tried to disrupt the Yemeni unification process by assassinating YSP leaders but was halted by Saudi Interior Minister Prince Nayef bin Abdulaziz after President Ali Abdullah Saleh complained to King Fahd. He was also angered by the internecine tribal fighting among the Afghans. However, he continued working with the Saudi GID and the Pakistani ISI. He funded the 1990 Afghan coup d'état attempt and also lobbied the Parliament of Pakistan to carry out an unsuccessful motion of no confidence against Prime Minister Benazir Bhutto.

The Iraqi invasion of Kuwait under Saddam Hussein on 2 August 1990, put the Saudi kingdom and the royal family at risk. With Iraqi forces on the Saudi border, Saddam's appeal to pan-Arabism was potentially inciting internal dissent. One week after King Fahd agreed to U.S. Secretary of Defense Dick Cheney's offer of American military assistance, Bin Laden met with King Fahd and Saudi Defense Minister Sultan, telling them not to depend on non-Muslim assistance from the United States and others and offering to help defend Saudi Arabia with his Arab legion. When Sultan asked how bin Laden would defend the fighters if Saddam used Iraqi chemical and biological weapons against them he replied "We will fight him with faith." Bin Laden's offer was rebuffed, and the Saudi monarchy invited the deployment of U.S. forces in Saudi territory.

Bin Laden publicly denounced Saudi dependence on the U.S. forces, arguing that the Quran prohibited non-Muslims from setting foot in the Arabian Peninsula and that two holiest shrines of Islam, Mecca and Medina, the cities in which the prophet Muhammad received and recited Allah's message, should only be defended by Muslims. Bin Laden tried to convince the Saudi ulama to issue a fatwa condemning the American military deployment but senior clerics refused out of fear of repression. Bin Laden's criticism of the Saudi monarchy led them to try to silence him. The U.S. 82nd Airborne Division landed in the north-eastern Saudi city of Dhahran and was deployed in the desert barely 400 miles from Medina.

Meanwhile, on 8 November 1990, the FBI raided the New Jersey home of El Sayyid Nosair, an associate of al-Qaeda operative Ali Mohamed. They discovered copious evidence of terrorist plots, including plans to blow up New York City skyscrapers. This marked the earliest discovery of al-Qaeda terrorist plans outside of Muslim countries. Nosair was eventually convicted in connection to the 1993 World Trade Center bombing, and later admitted guilt for the murder of Rabbi Meir Kahane in New York City on 5 November 1990.

Move to Sudan 
In 1991, bin Laden was expelled from Saudi Arabia by its government after repeatedly criticizing the Saudi alliance with the United States. He and his followers moved first to Afghanistan and then relocated to Sudan by 1992, in a deal brokered by Ali Mohamed. Bin Laden's personal security detail consisted of bodyguards personally selected by him. Their arsenal included SA-7, Stinger missiles, AK-47s, RPGs, and PK machine guns. Meanwhile, in March–April 1992, bin Laden tried to play a pacifying role in the escalating civil war in Afghanistan, by urging warlord Gulbuddin Hekmatyar to join the other mujahideen leaders negotiating a coalition government instead of trying to conquer Kabul for himself.

US intelligence monitored bin Laden in Sudan using operatives to run by daily and to photograph activities at his compound, and using an intelligence safe house and signals intelligence to surveil him and to record his moves.

Sudan and return to Afghanistan 
In Sudan, bin Laden established a new base for Mujahideen operations in Khartoum. He bought a house on Al-Mashtal Street in the affluent Al-Riyadh quarter and a retreat at Soba on the Blue Nile. During his time in Sudan, he heavily invested in the infrastructure, in agriculture and businesses. He was the Sudan agent for the British firm Hunting Surveys, and built roads using the same bulldozers he had employed to construct mountain tracks in Afghanistan. Many of his labourers were the same fighters who had been his comrades in the war against the Soviet Union. He was generous to the poor and popular with the people. He continued to criticize King Fahd of Saudi Arabia. In response, in 1994 Fahd stripped bin Laden of his Saudi citizenship and persuaded his family to cut off his $7 million a year stipend.

By that time, bin Laden was being linked with Egyptian Islamic Jihad (EIJ), which made up the core of al-Qaeda. In 1995 the EIJ attempted to assassinate the Egyptian President Hosni Mubarak. The attempt failed, and Sudan expelled the EIJ.

The US State Department accused Sudan of being a sponsor of international terrorism and bin Laden of operating terrorist training camps in the Sudanese desert. However, according to Sudan officials, this stance became obsolete as the Islamist political leader Hassan al-Turabi lost influence in their country. The Sudanese wanted to engage with the US but American officials refused to meet with them even after they had expelled bin Laden. It was not until 2000 that the State Department authorized US intelligence officials to visit Sudan.

The 9/11 Commission Report states:

In late 1995, when Bin Laden was still in Sudan, the State Department and the Central Intelligence Agency (CIA) learned that Sudanese officials were discussing with the Saudi government the possibility of expelling Bin Laden. CIA paramilitary officer Billy Waugh tracked down Bin Ladin in Sudan and prepared an operation to apprehend him, but was denied authorization. US Ambassador Timothy Carney encouraged the Sudanese to pursue this course. The Saudis, however, did not want Bin Laden, giving as their reason their revocation of his citizenship. Sudan's minister of defense, Fatih Erwa, has claimed that Sudan offered to hand Bin Laden over to the United States. The Commission has found no credible evidence that this was so. Ambassador Carney had instructions only to push the Sudanese to expel Bin Laden. Ambassador Carney had no legal basis to ask for more from the Sudanese since, at the time, there was no indictment outstanding against bin Laden in any country.

The 9/11 Commission Report further states:

In February 1996, Sudanese officials began approaching officials from the United States and other governments, asking what actions of theirs might ease foreign pressure. In secret meetings with Saudi officials, Sudan offered to expel Bin Laden to Saudi Arabia and asked the Saudis to pardon him. US officials became aware of these secret discussions, certainly by March. Saudi officials apparently wanted Bin Laden expelled from Sudan. They had already revoked his citizenship, however, and would not tolerate his presence in their country. Also Bin Laden may have no longer felt safe in Sudan, where he had already escaped at least one assassination attempt that he believed to have been the work of the Egyptian or Saudi regimes, and paid for by the CIA.

Due to the increasing pressure on Sudan from Saudi Arabia, Egypt, and the United States, bin Laden was permitted to leave for a country of his choice. He chose to return to Jalalabad, Afghanistan aboard a chartered flight on 18 May 1996; there he forged a close relationship with Mullah Mohammed Omar. According to the 9/11 Commission, the expulsion from Sudan significantly weakened bin Laden and his organization. Some African intelligence sources have argued that the expulsion left bin Laden without an option other than becoming a full-time radical, and that most of the 300 Afghan Arabs who left with him subsequently became terrorists. Various sources report that bin Laden lost between $20 million and $300 million in Sudan; the government seized his construction equipment, and bin Laden was forced to liquidate his businesses, land, and even his horses.

1996 Declaration of war and 1998 fatwa 

In August 1996, bin Laden issued a fatwa titled "Declaration of War against the Americans Occupying the Land of the Two Holy Places" which was published by Al-Quds Al-Arabi, a London-based newspaper. Saudi Arabia is sometimes called "The Land of the Two Holy Mosques" in reference to Mecca and Medina, the two holiest places in Islam. The reference to occupation in the fatwā referred to US forces based in Saudi Arabia for the purpose of controlling air space in Iraq, known as Operation Southern Watch. Despite the assurance of President George H. W. Bush to King Fahd in 1990, that all US forces based in Saudi Arabia would be withdrawn once the Iraqi threat had been dealt with, by 1996 the Americans were still there. Bush cited the necessity of dealing with the remnants of Saddam's regime (which Bush had chosen not to destroy). Bin Laden's view was that "the 'evils' of the Middle East arose from America's attempt to take over the region and from its support for Israel. Saudi Arabia had been turned into an American colony". 

Fervently attacking American support for Israel and Saudi Arabia as well as its sanctions on Iraq, Bin Laden declared in the fatwa: "Terrorising you, while you are carrying arms on our land, is a legitimate and morally demanded duty. It is a legitimate right well known to all humans and other creatures... [our] youths are different from your soldiers. Your problem will be how to convince your troops to fight, while our problem will be how to restrain our youths.. The youths hold you responsible for all of the killings and evictions of the Muslims and the violation of the sanctities, carried out by your Zionist brothers in Lebanon; you openly supplied them with arms and finance. More than 600,000 Iraqi children have died due to lack of food and medicine and as a result of the unjustifiable aggression (sanction) imposed on Iraq and its nation. The children of Iraq are our children. You, the USA, together with the Saudi regime are responsible for the shedding of the blood of these innocent children. Due to all of that, what ever treaty you have with our country is now null and void."

In 1998 he issued another fatwā against the United States, calling upon Muslims to attack America and its allies. It was entitled "Declaration of the World Islamic Front for Jihad against the Jews and the Crusaders". The fatwa broke from classical Sunni legal tradition; by also advocating the killing of civilians, in addition to enemy combatants.

In Afghanistan, bin Laden and al-Qaeda raised money from donors from the days of the Soviet jihad, and from the Pakistani ISI to establish more training camps for Mujahideen fighters. Bin Laden effectively took over Ariana Afghan Airlines, which ferried Islamic militants, arms, cash, and opium through the United Arab Emirates and Pakistan, as well as provided false identifications to members of bin Laden's terrorist network. The arms smuggler Viktor Bout helped to run the airline, maintaining planes and loading cargo. Michael Scheuer, head of the CIA's bin Laden unit, concluded that Ariana was being used as a terrorist taxi service.

Early attacks and aid for attacks 
It is believed that the first bombing attack involving bin Laden was the 29 December 1992, bombing of the Gold Mihor Hotel in Aden in which two people were killed.

After this bombing, al-Qaeda was reported to have developed its justification for the killing of innocent people. According to a fatwa issued by Mamdouh Mahmud Salim, the killing of someone standing near the enemy is justified because any innocent bystander will find a proper reward in death, going to Jannah (paradise) if they were good Muslims and to Jahannam (hell) if they were bad or non-believers. The fatwa was issued to al-Qaeda members but not the general public.

In the 1990s, bin Laden's al-Qaeda assisted jihadis financially and sometimes militarily in Algeria, Egypt, and Afghanistan. In 1992 or 1993, bin Laden sent an emissary, Qari el-Said, with $40,000 to Algeria to aid the Islamists and urge war rather than negotiation with the government. Their advice was heeded. The war that followed caused the deaths of 150,000–200,000 Algerians and ended with the Islamist surrender to the government. In January 1996, the CIA launched a new unit of its Counterterrorism Center (CTC) called Bin Laden Issue Station, code-named "Alec Station", to track and to carry out operations against Bin Laden's activities. Bin Laden Issue Station was headed by Michael Scheuer, a veteran of the Islamic Extremism Branch of the CTC.

Late 1990s attacks 
It has been claimed that bin Laden funded the Luxor massacre of 17 November 1997, which killed 62 civilians, and outraged the Egyptian public. In mid-1997, the Northern Alliance threatened to overrun Jalalabad, causing bin Laden to abandon his Najim Jihad compound and move his operations to Tarnak Farms in the south.

Another successful attack was carried out in the city of Mazar-i-Sharif in Afghanistan. Bin Laden helped cement his alliance with the Taliban by sending several hundred Afghan Arab fighters along to help the Taliban kill between five and six thousand Hazaras overrunning the city.

In February 1998, Osama bin Laden and Ayman al-Zawahiri co-signed a fatwa in the name of the World Islamic Front for Jihad Against Jews and Crusaders, which declared the killing of North Americans and their allies an "individual duty for every Muslim" to liberate the al-Aqsa Mosque (in Jerusalem) and the holy mosque (in Mecca) from their grip. At the public announcement, fatwa bin Laden announced that North Americans are "very easy targets". He told the attending journalists, "You will see the results of this in a very short time."

Bin Laden and al-Zawahiri organized an al-Qaeda congress on 24 June 1998. The 1998 US embassy bombings were a series of attacks that occurred on 7 August 1998, in which hundreds of people were killed in simultaneous truck bomb explosions at the United States embassies in the major East African cities of Dar es Salaam, Tanzania, and Nairobi, Kenya. The attacks were linked to local members of the Egyptian Islamic Jihad, and brought Osama bin Laden and Ayman al-Zawahiri to the attention of the United States public for the first time. Al-Qaeda later claimed responsibility for the bombings.

In retaliation for the embassy bombings, President Bill Clinton ordered a series of cruise missile strikes on bin Laden-related targets in Sudan and Afghanistan on 20 August 1998. In December 1998, the Director of Central Intelligence Counterterrorist Center reported to President Clinton that al-Qaeda was preparing for attacks in the United States of America, including the training of personnel to hijack aircraft. On 7 June 1999, the US Federal Bureau of Investigation placed bin Laden on its Ten Most Wanted list.

At the end of 2000, Richard Clarke revealed that Islamic militants headed by bin Laden had planned a triple attack on 3 January 2000, which would have included bombings in Jordan of the Radisson SAS Hotel in Amman, tourists at Mount Nebo, and a site on the Jordan River, as well as the sinking of the destroyer  in Yemen, and an attack on a target within the United States. The plan was foiled by the arrest of the Jordanian terrorist cell, the sinking of the explosive-filled skiff intended to target the destroyer, and the arrest of Ahmed Ressam.

Yugoslav Wars 

A former US State Department official in October 2001 described Bosnia and Herzegovina as a safe haven for terrorists, and asserted that militant elements of the former Sarajevo government were protecting extremists, some with ties to Osama bin Laden. In 1997, Rzeczpospolita, one of the largest Polish daily newspapers, had reported that intelligence services of the Nordic-Polish SFOR Brigade suspected that a center for training terrorists from Islamic countries was located in the Bocina Donja village near Maglaj in Bosnia and Herzegovina. In 1992, hundreds of volunteers joined an all-mujahedeen unit called El Moujahed in an abandoned hillside factory, a compound with a hospital and prayer hall.

According to Middle East intelligence reports, bin Laden financed small convoys of recruits from the Arab world through his businesses in Sudan. Among them was Karim Said Atmani, who was identified by authorities as the document forger for a group of Algerians accused of plotting the bombings in the United States. He is a former roommate of Ahmed Ressam, the man arrested at the Canada–United States border in mid-December 1999 with a car full of nitroglycerin and bomb-making materials. He was convicted of colluding with Osama bin Laden by a French court.

Khalil al-Deek was arrested in Jordan in late December 1999 on suspicion of involvement in a plot to blow up tourist sites. A second man with Bosnian citizenship, Hamid Aich, lived in Canada at the same time as Atmani and worked for a charity associated with Osama bin Laden. In its 26 June 1997 report on the bombing of the Al Khobar building in Riyadh, Saudi Arabia, The New York Times noted that those arrested confessed to serving with Bosnian Muslim forces. Further, the captured men also admitted to ties with Osama bin Laden.

In 1999, the press reported that bin Laden and his Tunisian assistant Mehrez Aodouni were granted citizenship and Bosnian passports in 1993 by the government in Sarajevo. The Bosnian government denied this information following the September 11 attacks, but it was later found that Aodouni was arrested in Turkey and that at that time he possessed the Bosnian passport. Following this revelation, a new explanation was given that bin Laden did not personally collect his Bosnian passport and that officials at the Bosnian embassy in Vienna, which issued the passport, could not have known who bin Laden was at the time.

The Bosnian daily Oslobođenje published in 2001 that three men, believed to be linked to bin Laden, were arrested in Sarajevo in July 2001. The three, one of whom was identified as Imad El Misri, were Egyptian nationals. The paper said that two of the suspects were holding Bosnian passports.

The head of Albania's State Intelligence Service (SHISH), Fatos Klosi, said that Osama was running a terror network in Albania to take part in the Kosovo War under the guise of a humanitarian organisation and it was reported to have been started in 1994. Claude Kader, who was a member, testified its existence during his trial. By 1998, four members of Egyptian Islamic Jihad (EIJ) were arrested in Albania and extradited to Egypt. The mujahideen fighters were organised by Islamic leaders in Western Europe allied to him and Zawihiri.

During his trial at the International Criminal Tribunal for the Former Yugoslavia, former Serbian President Slobodan Milošević quoted from a purported FBI report that bin Laden's al-Qaeda had a presence in the Balkans and aided the Kosovo Liberation Army. He claimed bin Laden had used Albania as a launchpad for violence in the region and Europe. He claimed that they had informed Richard Holbrooke that KLA was being aided by al-Qaeda but the US decided to cooperate with the KLA and thus indirectly with Osama despite the 1998 United States embassy bombings earlier. Milošević had argued that the United States aided the terrorists, which culminated in its backing of the 1999 NATO bombing of Yugoslavia during the Kosovo War.

September 11 attacks 

After his initial denial, in the wake of the attacks, bin Laden announced, "what the United States is tasting today is nothing compared to what we have tasted for decades. Our umma has known this humiliation and contempt for over eighty years. Its sons are killed, its blood is spilled, its holy sites are attacked, and it is not governed according to Allah's command. Despite this, no one cares". In response to the attacks, the United States launched the War on Terror to depose the Taliban regime in Afghanistan and capture al-Qaeda operatives, and several countries strengthened their anti-terrorism legislation to preclude future attacks. The CIA's Special Activities Division was given the lead in tracking down and killing or capturing bin Laden.
The Federal Bureau of Investigation has stated that classified evidence linking al-Qaeda and bin Laden to the September 11 attacks is clear and irrefutable. The UK Government reached a similar conclusion regarding al-Qaeda and Osama bin Laden's culpability for the September 11 attacks, although the government report noted that the evidence presented is not necessarily sufficient to prosecute the case.

Bin Laden initially denied involvement in the attacks. On 16 September 2001, bin Laden read a statement later broadcast by Qatar's Al Jazeera satellite channel denying responsibility for the attack. In a videotape recovered by U.S. forces in November 2001 in Jalalabad, bin Laden was seen discussing the attack with Khaled al-Harbi in a way that indicates foreknowledge. The tape was broadcast on various news networks on 13 December 2001. The merits of this translation have been disputed. Arabist Dr. Abdel El M. Husseini stated: "This translation is very problematic. At the most important places where it is held to prove the guilt of bin Laden, it is not identical with the Arabic."

In the 2004 video, bin Laden abandoned his denials without retracting past statements. In it he said he had personally directed the nineteen hijackers. In the 18-minute tape, played on Al-Jazeera, four days before the American presidential election, bin Laden accused U.S. President George W. Bush of negligence in the hijacking of the planes on 11 September. According to the tapes, bin Laden claimed he was inspired to destroy the World Trade Center after watching the destruction of towers in Lebanon by Israel during the 1982 Lebanon War.

Through two other tapes aired by Al Jazeera in 2006, Osama bin Laden announced, "I am the one in charge of the nineteen brothers. ... I was responsible for entrusting the nineteen brothers ... with the raids" (23 May 2006). In the tapes he was seen with Ramzi bin al-Shibh, as well as two of the 9/11 hijackers, Hamza al-Ghamdi, and Wail al-Shehri, as they made preparations for the attacks (videotape broadcast 7 September 2006). Identified motivations of the September 11 attacks include the support of Israel by the United States, presence of the US military in the Kingdom of Saudi Arabia, and the US enforcement of sanctions against Iraq.

Criminal charges 
On 16 March 1998, Libya issued the first official Interpol arrest warrant against bin Laden and three other people. They were charged for killing Silvan Becker, agent of Germany's domestic intelligence service, the Federal Office for the Protection of the Constitution, in the Terrorism Department, and his wife Vera in Libya on 10 March 1994. Bin Laden was still wanted by the Libyan government at the time of his death. Osama bin Laden was first indicted by a grand jury of the United States on 8 June 1998, on a charges of conspiracy to attack defense utilities of the United States and prosecutors further charged that bin Laden was the head of the terrorist organization called al-Qaeda, and that he was a major financial backer of Islamic fighters worldwide. On 4 November 1998, Osama bin Laden was indicted by a Federal Grand Jury in the United States District Court for the Southern District of New York, on charges of Murder of US Nationals Outside the United States, Conspiracy to Murder US Nationals Outside the United States, and Attacks on a Federal Facility Resulting in Death for his alleged role in the 1998 United States embassy bombings in Kenya and Tanzania. The evidence against bin Laden included courtroom testimony by former al-Qaeda members and satellite phone records, from a phone purchased for him by al-Qaeda procurement agent Ziyad Khaleel in the United States. However the Taliban ruled not to extradite Bin Laden on the grounds that there was insufficient evidence published in the indictments and that non-Muslim courts lacked standing to try Muslims.

Bin Laden became the 456th person listed on the FBI Ten Most Wanted Fugitives list, when he was added on 7 June 1999, following his indictment along with others for capital crimes in the 1998 embassy attacks. Attempts at assassination and requests for the extradition of bin Laden from the Taliban of Afghanistan were met with failure before the bombing of Afghanistan in October 2001. In 1999, US President Bill Clinton convinced the United Nations to impose sanctions against Afghanistan in an attempt to force the Taliban to extradite him.

On 10 October 2001, bin Laden appeared as well on the initial list of the top 22 FBI Most Wanted Terrorists, which was released to the public by the President of the United States George W. Bush, in direct response to the September 11 attacks, but which was again based on the indictment for the 1998 embassy attack. Bin Laden was among a group of thirteen fugitive terrorists wanted on that latter list for questioning about the 1998 embassy bombings. Bin Laden remains the only fugitive ever to be listed on both FBI fugitive lists.

Despite the multiple indictments listed above and multiple requests, the Taliban refused to extradite Osama bin Laden. However, they did offer to try him before an Islamic court if evidence of Osama bin Laden's involvement in the September 11 attacks was provided. It was not until eight days after the bombing of Afghanistan began in October 2001 that the Taliban finally did offer to turn over Osama bin Laden to a third-party country for trial in return for the United States ending the bombing. This offer was rejected by President Bush stating that this was no longer negotiable, with Bush responding "there's no need to discuss innocence or guilt. We know he's guilty."

On 15 June 2011, federal prosecutors of the United States of America officially dropped all criminal charges against Osama bin Laden following his death in May.

Pursuit by the United States

Clinton administration 
Capturing Osama bin Laden had been an objective of the United States government since the presidency of Bill Clinton. Shortly after the September 11 attacks it was revealed that President Clinton had signed a directive authorizing the CIA (and specifically their elite Special Activities Division) to apprehend bin Laden and bring him to the United States to stand trial after the 1998 United States embassy bombings in Africa; if taking bin Laden alive was deemed impossible, then deadly force was authorized. On 20 August 1998, 66 cruise missiles launched by United States Navy ships in the Arabian Sea struck bin Laden's training camps near Khost in Afghanistan, missing him by a few hours. In 1999 the CIA, together with Pakistani military intelligence, had prepared a team of approximately 60 Pakistani commandos to infiltrate Afghanistan to capture or kill bin Laden, but the plan was aborted by the 1999 Pakistani coup d'état; in 2000, foreign operatives working on behalf of the CIA had fired a rocket-propelled grenade at a convoy of vehicles in which bin Laden was traveling through the mountains of Afghanistan, hitting one of the vehicles but not the one in which bin Laden was riding.

In 2000, before the September 11 attacks, Paul Bremer characterized the Clinton administration as correctly focused on bin Laden, while Robert Oakley criticized their obsession with Osama.

Bush administration 

Immediately after the September 11 attacks, US government officials named bin Laden and the al-Qaeda organization as the prime suspects and offered a reward of $25 million for information leading to his capture or death. On 13 July 2007, the Senate voted to double the reward to $50 million, although the amount was never changed. The Airline Pilots Association and the Air Transport Association offered an additional $2 million reward.

Bin Laden was believed to be hiding in the White Mountains (Spin Ghar) in Afghanistan's east, near the Pakistani border. According to The Washington Post, the US government concluded that Osama bin Laden was present during the Battle of Tora Bora, Afghanistan in late 2001, and according to civilian and military officials with first-hand knowledge, failure by the United States to commit enough US ground troops to hunt him led to his escape and was the gravest failure by the United States in the war against al-Qaeda. Intelligence officials assembled what they believed to be decisive evidence, from contemporary and subsequent interrogations and intercepted communications, that bin Laden began the Battle of Tora Bora inside the cave complex along Afghanistan's mountainous eastern border.

The Washington Post also reported that the CIA unit composed of special operations paramilitary forces dedicated to capturing bin Laden was shut down in late 2005.

US and Afghanistan forces raided the mountain caves in Tora Bora between 14–16 August 2007. The military was drawn to the area after receiving intelligence of a pre-Ramadan meeting held by al-Qaeda members. After killing dozens of al-Qaeda and Taliban members, they did not find either Osama bin Laden or Ayman al-Zawahiri.

Obama administration 

On 7 October 2008, in the second presidential debate, on foreign policy, then-presidential candidate Barack Obama pledged, "We will kill bin Laden. We will crush al-Qaeda. That has to be our biggest national security priority." Upon being elected, then President-elect Obama expressed his plans to renew US commitment to finding al-Qaeda leader Osama bin Laden, according to his national security advisers in an effort to ratchet up the hunt for the terrorist. President Obama rejected the Bush administration's policy on bin Laden that conflated all terror threats from al-Qaeda to Hamas to Hezbollah, replacing it with a covert, laserlike focus on al-Qaeda and its spawn.

US Secretary of Defense Robert Gates said in December 2009 that officials had had no reliable information on bin Laden's whereabouts for years. One week later, General Stanley McChrystal, the top US commander in Afghanistan said in December 2009 that al-Qaeda would not be defeated unless its leader, Osama bin Laden, were captured or killed. Testifying to the US Congress, he said that bin Laden had become an iconic figure, whose survival emboldens al-Qaeda as a franchising organization across the world, and that Obama's deployment of 30,000 extra troops to Afghanistan meant that success would be possible. "I don't think that we can finally defeat al-Qaeda until he's captured or killed", McChrystal said of bin Laden. According to him, killing or capturing bin Laden would not spell the end of al-Qaeda, but the movement could not be eradicated while he remained at large.

In April 2011, President Obama ordered a covert operation to kill or capture bin Laden. On 2 May 2011, the White House announced that SEAL Team Six had successfully carried out the operation, killing him in his Abbottabad compound in Pakistan.

Activities and whereabouts after the September 11 attacks 

While referring to Osama bin Laden in a CNN film clip on 17 September 2001, then-President George W. Bush stated, "I want justice. There is an old poster out west, as I recall, that said, 'Wanted: Dead or alive'". Subsequently, bin Laden retreated further from public contact to avoid capture. Numerous speculative press reports were issued about his whereabouts or even death; some placed bin Laden in different locations during overlapping time periods. None were ever definitively proven. After military offensives in Afghanistan failed to uncover his whereabouts, Pakistan was regularly identified as his suspected hiding place. Some of the conflicting reports regarding bin Laden's whereabouts and mistaken claims about his death follow:
 On 11 December 2005, a letter from Atiyah Abd al-Rahman to Abu Musab al-Zarqawi indicated that bin Laden and the al-Qaeda leadership were based in the Waziristan region of Pakistan at the time. In the letter, translated by the United States military's Combating Terrorism Center at West Point, Atiyah instructs Zarqawi to send messengers to Waziristan so that they meet with the brothers of the leadership. Al-Rahman also indicates that bin Laden and al-Qaeda are weak and have many of their own problems. The letter has been deemed authentic by military and counterterrorism officials, according to The Washington Post.
 Al-Qaeda continued to release time-sensitive and professionally verified videos demonstrating bin Laden's continued survival, including in August 2007. Bin Laden claimed sole responsibility for the September 11 attacks and specifically denied any prior knowledge of them by the Taliban or the Afghan people.
 In 2009, a research team led by Thomas W. Gillespie and John A. Agnew of UCLA used satellite-aided geographical analysis to pinpoint three compounds in Parachinar as bin Laden's likely hideouts.
 In March 2009, the New York Daily News reported that the hunt for bin Laden had centered in the Chitral District of Pakistan, including the Kalam Valley. Author Rohan Gunaratna stated that captured al-Qaeda leaders had confirmed that bin Laden was hiding in Chitral.
 In the first week of December 2009, a Taliban detainee in Pakistan said he had information that bin Laden was in Afghanistan in 2009. The detainee reported that in January or February (2009) he met a trusted contact who had seen bin Laden in Afghanistan about 15 to 20 days earlier. However, on 6 December 2009, US Secretary of Defense Robert Gates stated that the United States had had no reliable information on the whereabouts of bin Laden in years. Pakistan's Prime Minister Gillani rejected claims that Osama bin Laden was hiding in Pakistan.
 On 9 December 2009, BBC News reported that US Army General Stanley A. McChrystal (Commander of US and ISAF forces in Afghanistan from 15 June 2009, to 23 June 2010) emphasized the continued importance of the capture or killing of bin Laden, thus indicating that the US high command believed that bin Laden was still alive.
 On 2 February 2010, Afghan president Hamid Karzai arrived in Saudi Arabia for an official visit. The agenda included a discussion of a possible Saudi role in Karzai's plan to reintegrate Taliban militants. During the visit, an anonymous official of the Saudi Foreign Affairs Ministry declared that the kingdom had no intention of getting involved in peacemaking in Afghanistan unless the Taliban severed ties with extremists and expelled Osama bin Laden.
 On 7 June 2010, the Kuwaiti newspaper Al-Seyassah reported that bin Laden was hiding out in the mountainous town of Sabzevar, in northeastern Iran. On 9 June, The Australian's online edition repeated the claim. This report turned out to be false.
 On 18 October 2010, an unnamed NATO official suggested that bin Laden was alive, well, and living comfortably in Pakistan, protected by elements of the country's intelligence services. A senior Pakistani official denied the allegations and said that the accusations were designed to put pressure on the Pakistani government ahead of talks aimed at strengthening ties between Pakistan and the United States.

On 29 March 2012, Pakistani newspaper Dawn acquired a report produced by Pakistani security officials, based on interrogation of his three surviving wives, that detailed his movements while living underground in Pakistan.

In a 2010 letter, bin Laden chastised followers who had reinterpreted al-tatarrus—an Islamic doctrine meant to excuse the unintended killing of non-combatants in unusual circumstances—to justify routine massacres of Muslim civilians, which had turned Muslims against the extremist movement. Of the groups affiliated with al-Qaeda, Bin Laden condemned Tehrik-i-Taliban Pakistan for an attack on members of a hostile tribe, declaring that the operation is not justified, as there were casualties of noncombatants. Bin Laden wrote that the tatarrus doctrine needs to be revisited based on the modern-day context and clear boundaries established. He asked a subordinate to draw up a jihadist code of conduct that would constrain military operations in order to avoid civilian casualties. In Yemen, Bin Laden urged his allies to seek a truce that would bring the country stability, or would at least show the people that they were careful in keeping Muslims safe on the basis of peace. In Somalia, he called attention to the extreme poverty caused by constant warfare, and he advised al-Shabab to pursue economic development. He instructed his followers around the world to focus on education and persuasion rather than entering into confrontations with Islamic political parties.

Whereabouts just before his death 
In April 2011, various US intelligence outlets traced Bin Laden to Abbottabad, Pakistan. Imagery from Google Earth indicates that the compound was built between 2001 and 2005.

Death and aftermath 

Osama bin Laden was killed in Abbottabad, Pakistan, on 2 May 2011, shortly after 1:00 AM local time (4:00 PM Eastern Time) by a United States military special operations unit.

The operation, code-named Operation Neptune Spear, was ordered by United States President Barack Obama and carried out in a US Central Intelligence Agency (CIA) operation by a team of United States Navy SEALs from the United States Naval Special Warfare Development Group (also known as DEVGRU or informally by its former name, SEAL Team Six) of the Joint Special Operations Command, with support from CIA operatives on the ground. The raid on bin Laden's compound in Abbottabad was launched from Afghanistan. After the raid, reports at the time stated that US forces had taken bin Laden's body to Afghanistan for positive identification, then buried it at sea, in accordance with Islamic law, within 24 hours of his death.

Pakistani authorities later demolished the compound in February 2012 to prevent it from becoming a neo-Islamist shrine. In February 2013, Pakistan announced plans to build a PKR 265 million (US$30 million) amusement park in the area, including the property of the former hideout. In an interview in 2019, Pakistani prime minister Imran Khan claimed that Pakistani intelligence led the CIA to Osama bin Laden.

It was widely reported by the press that bin Laden was fatally wounded by Robert J. O'Neill, however, it has also been widely discredited by witnesses, who claim that bin Laden was possibly already dead by the time O'Neill arrived, having been injured by an anonymous SEAL Team Six member referred to under the pseudonym "Red". According to Navy SEAL Matt Bissonnette, bin Laden was struck by two suppressed shots to the side of the head from around ten feet away after leaning out of his bedroom doorway to survey Bissonnette and a point man, once the Navy SEALs entered the bedroom, his body began convulsing before Bissonnette and another SEAL responded by firing multiple shots into his chest.

Allegations of Pakistan support-protection of bin Laden 

Bin Laden was killed within the fortified complex of buildings that were probably built for him, and had reportedly been his home for at least five years. While the United States and Pakistan governments both claimed, and later maintained, that no Pakistani officials, including senior military leaders, knew bin Laden's whereabouts or had prior knowledge of the US strike, Carlotta Gall, writing in The New York Times Magazine in 2014, reported that ISI Director General Ahmad Shuja Pasha knew of bin Laden's presence in Abbottabad. In a 2015 London Review of Books article, investigative reporter Seymour M. Hersh asserted—citing US sources—that bin Laden had been a prisoner of the ISI at the Abbottabad compound since 2006; that Pasha knew of the US mission in advance, and authorized the helicopters delivering the SEALs to enter Pakistani airspace; and that the CIA learned of bin Laden's whereabouts from a former senior Pakistani intelligence officer, who was paid an estimated $25 million for the information. Both stories were denied by US and Pakistani officials.

Mosharraf Zia, a leading Pakistani columnist, stated, "It seems deeply improbable that bin Laden could have been where he was killed without the knowledge of some parts of the Pakistani state." Pakistan's United States envoy, Ambassador Husain Haqqani, promised a "full inquiry" into how Pakistani intelligence services could have failed to find bin Laden in a fortified compound so close to Islamabad. "Obviously bin Laden did have a support system", he said. "The issue is, was that support system within the government and the state of Pakistan, or within the society of Pakistan?"

Others argued that bin Laden lived in the compound with a local family, and never used the internet or a mobile phone, which would have made him much easier to locate. Pakistan's president Asif Ali Zardari denied that his country's security forces sheltered bin Laden, and called any supposed support for bin Laden by the Pakistani government baseless speculation. Government officials said that the country's limited resources had been committed to its war against the Pakistan Taliban, and other insurgents who posed an active threat to it, rather than to finding or sheltering bin Laden. Coll states that as of 2019 there is no direct evidence showing Pakistani knowledge of bin Laden's presence in Abbottabad. Documents captured from the Abbottabad compound generally show that bin Laden was wary of contact with Pakistani intelligence and police, especially in light of Pakistan's role in the arrest of Khalid Sheikh Mohammed.

Legacy 
Despite condemnations from U.S-allied governments in the Arab world, anti-American protestors from Pakistan to Palestinian territories used Bin Laden's portraits during their protests, speeches and public campaigns; owing to his widespread popularity that once pervaded the Arab World  in the early 2000s. His popularity reached its apex through the course of the Iraq war; during which opinion polls conducted in various Muslim countries gave him 50% - 60% favourable ratings.

See also 

 The Golden Chain
 Islamic extremism
 Islamic fundamentalism
 Islamic terrorism
 List of assassinations by the United States
 Osama bin Laden in popular culture
 Pakistan and state-sponsored terrorism

Notes

References

Bibliography

Further reading 

 
 
 
 
 
 
 Foreign Broadcast Information Service (2006) – Compilation of Usama Bin Laden Statements 1994 – January 2004

External links 

 
 Osama bin Laden collected news and commentary at Dawn
 
 
 Osama bin Laden news at JURIST
 Full text: bin Laden's 'letter to America', The Observer, 24 November 2002
 Hunting Bin Laden, PBS Frontline, (November 2002)
 "5 Facts You Probably Didn't Know About Osama bin Laden", Dainik Bhaskar, (May 2016)
 Young Osama, Steve Coll, The New Yorker, 12 December 2005
 How the World Sees Osama bin Laden, slideshow by Life
 The Osama bin Laden File from the National Security Archive, posted 2 May 2011
 Letters from Abbottabad from Combating Terrorism Center
 FBI Records: The Vault – Osama Bin Laden

1957 births
2011 deaths
20th-century criminals
20th-century Muslims
21st-century criminals
21st-century Muslims
Abdullah Yusuf Azzam
Afghanistan conflict (1978–present)
Al-Qaeda founders
Al-Qaeda propagandists
Anti-Americanism
Anti-imperialism in Africa
Anti-imperialism in Asia
Antisemitism in Africa
Antisemitism in Asia
Antisemitism in Saudi Arabia
Anti-Zionism in the Arab world
Assassinated al-Qaeda leaders
Assassinations by the United States
Assassinations in Pakistan
Atharis
Osama bin Laden
Burials at sea
Deaths by firearm in Khyber Pakhtunkhwa
Extrajudicial killings
FBI Most Wanted Terrorists
Individuals designated as terrorists by the United States government
Islamist mass murderers
Leaders of Islamic terror groups
Mujahideen members of the Soviet–Afghan War
 
People associated with the September 11 attacks
People designated by the Al-Qaida and Taliban Sanctions Committee
People from Riyadh
People of the War in Afghanistan (2001–2021)
Saudi Arabian al-Qaeda members
Saudi Arabian anti-communists
Saudi Arabian criminals
Saudi Arabian emigrants to Pakistan
Saudi Arabian expatriates in Afghanistan
Saudi Arabian expatriates in Sudan
Saudi Arabian mass murderers
Saudi Arabian people of Syrian descent
Saudi Arabian people of Yemeni descent
Saudi Arabian propagandists
Saudi Arabian Salafis
Qutbists
Salafi jihadists
Saudi Arabian Qutbists
War on terror
Saudi Arabian civil engineers